Sarah Grab (born 13 July 1978) is a road cyclist from Switzerland. She represented her nation at the 2002, 2004 and 2005 UCI Road World Championships.

References

External links
 profile at Procyclingstats.com

1978 births
Swiss female cyclists
Living people
Place of birth missing (living people)